Buddy's Bearcats is a 1934 Warner Bros. Looney Tunes cartoon, directed by Jack King. The short was released on June 23, 1934, and stars Buddy, the second star of the series.

Summary
We come to a sign that announces "Baseball to-day: Buddy's Bearcats vs. Battling Bruisers." Below, hundreds, perhaps thousands, of fans rush into the ballpark; patrons buy tickets and walk through a turnstile. One particularly large man is called back to the ticket window after purchasing his admission and is measured by the operator of the window: "Two seats!" the ticket salesman declares. The man happily obliges and purchases a second ticket for himself! Two tall, bearded gentlemen (in top hats, no less), one holding the shoulders of the other in front, compress themselves, and sneak, with impunity, under the turnstile and the nose of the ticket salesman.

A young man with light, curly hair observes the park from, and without through a crack in the fence and says: "It's Buddy!" We then see Our Hero, grandly bearing the attire of his team and cheerfully playing and tossing a ball around his shoulders and chest. Two other men watch through holes in the fence: as a gag, one's hole in the fence is so much higher than the other's, making viewing difficult, unless one simply reaches up and pulls down the high hole, thereby lowering it and raising the other's hole, to the inconvenience of the other.

A dog sits beneath the same curly-haired man from before, and another fellow uses the canine's tail as a crank that curves the dog's midsection upwards, allowing the young man a far better view of the field (or simply a chance to leap over the fence.) An apparently Scotch couple inflates a set of bagpipes, then ties them, as a hot air balloon, to a drum, which serves as a platform, that the couple might float in the air and leap over the fence as well. The fans sway about in the stands, and an unusually blond Cookie greets Buddy and vice versa.

Buddy uses a baseball to play a set of bats as though they were a xylophone, then catches the ball in his back pocket. A food vendor named Willie King sings about his hot dogs; a whimsical drink vendor walks the stands and sends a soda pop over to a young patron by means of a little propeller. A very musical announcer introduces us to the Battling Bruisers, the team on his right; and on his left, "the greatest team the world has ever seen: Buddy and his Bearcats." The game begins, narrated by a parody of Joe E. Brown on a radio station KFWB (not to be confused with KFWB in Los Angeles), who swallows a ball thrown, in his direction from a foul ball, by Buddy. Meanwhile, Buddy rubs his hands with dirt; a Bruiser squirts oil under his arms and throws a pitch to Buddy, who then hits the ball and runs (and skates) to second base for a double. The fans are very pleased.

In the next scene, Buddy plans to wind the ball up like a toy to trick the Bruiser, then throws the tricky ball to a Bruiser, who can not seem to hit it but inside injures the catcher on accident; he slams down his bat, blows air (through a bug spray apparatus) at the ball that it falls (as would a dying fly), and simply picks it up, tosses it into the air, and hits it. An outfielder immediately catches the ball in deep left with a mechanical glove. Afterward, the radio announcer yells in front of the microphone, and the camera zooms up inside his mouth at the same time. Meanwhile, in the top half of the ninth, the score, as we see in the next scene, stands at forty-nine to forty-seven. The people want Buddy! But Our Hero, behind the scenes, is all too nervous to emerge and play; alone, he genuflects, and appears, for a moment, to pray. Cookie approaches him inside the bullpen and tells him of the great clamor for him from the spectators: Buddy is bashfully convinced. Buddy gladly takes the bat from another player (who looks like a taller, balder version of Buddy), hits a ball thrown by a maniacally laughing, mustachioed Bruiser, and runs about the diamond, cheered on by Cookie, who stands at the base. The game is won, and the two sweethearts, embracing, are buried in a deluge of the hats of happy fans.

Soundtrack
Some of the soundtracks used in this short were used from the Warner Bros film Smarty, which is released a month prior to the short.

Hot dog vendor
Willie King, the concession stand owner, played by Billy Bletcher, sings an original song by Norman Spencer, the musical director of the short. In the history of Warner Bros. cartoons, Willie King was, in fact, a concession stand owner who operated his business outside Leon Schlesinger's studio.

Cookie in this short
This is the first of but a few Buddy shorts in which Buddy's sweetheart Cookie has blond, braided hair. This would seem to be characteristic only of those Buddy cartoons supervised by Jack King, though not all of them.

References

External links
 Buddy's Bearcats on Dailymotion (Unrestored)

1934 films
1934 animated films
1930s American animated films
1930s animated short films
1930s sports films
American black-and-white films
American baseball films
Films scored by Norman Spencer (composer)
Films directed by Jack King
Buddy (Looney Tunes) films
Looney Tunes shorts